El Verger is a town of 4,992 inhabitants situated 3 kilometres from the Mediterranean Sea and 8 kilometres from Dénia, in the Comarca of Marina Alta, Land of Valencia, Spain.  The main attractions are the Main Street, two medieval towers and a neoclassical church. The town's crest, recently resuscitated, pays homage to its name: it displays two trees and four flowers.

The Prime Meridian crosses El Verger.

Geography

The municipal boundaries confront those of Beniarbeig, Benimeli, Murla, Dénia, Ondara and Els Poblets. The town is 91 km from both Alicante and Valencia, and constitutes part of the frontier between the Province of Alicante and that of Valencia. The Mediterranean is 3 kilometres to the northeast. The town is split in two by the river Girona, which flooded catastrophically in 2007, destroying many houses and taking a life. The largest part of El Verger is to be found on the western side of the river, and three bridges provide access to the other side and to the sea beyond. Behind El Verger lies the Segària mountain range, a place popular for hiking and which gives the local school its name. A large part of the surrounding lands is dedicated to  agriculture, specifically vegetables and citrus fruits.

References

External links 
 El Verger townhall 
 Municipal band website 
 El Verger's Moors and Christians website 
 Photos of the 2007 flood in El Verger

Gallery

Marina Alta
Towns in Spain